Cool Papa is a nickname. Notable people who have used the nickname include:

 Cool Papa Bell (1903–1991), American center fielder in Negro league baseball 
 Haskell Sadler (1935–1994), American blues singer, songwriter, and guitarist
 John T. Smith (blues musician) (1896–1940), American Texas blues musician
 Clarence "Cool Papa" Charleston, character on the TV series I'll Fly Away
American electronic musician
 Frederick "Cool Papa" Brown Arsonmatic Records

Nicknames in baseball
Nicknames in music